The 503 Kingston Rd is an east–west Toronto streetcar route in Ontario, Canada, operated by the Toronto Transit Commission. The 503 Kingston Rd travels on a route to the downtown financial district from the Bingham Loop along Kingston Road and shares much of its track with the 501 Queen and 504 King. Originally a rush-hour service, the route was upgraded in September 2019 to run weekdays excluding evenings after the consolidation of 502 Downtowner service into this route.

Route
Starting at the Bingham Loop on Victoria Park Avenue, the 503 runs southwest on Kingston Road then turns west along Queen Street. At the Queen Street Viaduct bridging the Don River, it then turns southwest along King Street, enters the King Street Transit Priority Corridor but leaves it by turning south on Church Street, west on Wellington Street and north on York Street. In the vicinity of St. Andrew station, the 503 returns eastbound on King Street.

The 503 Kingston Rd runs weekdays excluding evenings. Evening, weekend and holiday service is provided by the 22A Coxwell bus route replacing streetcar service along Kingston Road. The section to the west of Queen and Coxwell is served by the 501 Queen and 504 King streetcars. Both of these routes provide all-day service.

History

Two streetcar routes, 503 Kingston Rd and 502 Downtowner, serve Kingston Road. Route 502 Downtowner was originally named "Kingston Rd" while 503 Kingston Rd was originally named "Kingston Rd Tripper". The Kingston Rd route (today's 502 Downtowner) ran from the McCaul Loop to the Birchmount Loop until 1954 when it was cut back to the Bingham Loop. By 1968, the rush-hour route Kingston Rd Tripper (today's 503 Kingston Rd) was appearing in TTC Ride Guides. "Tripper" here means a rush-hour variant of a base route which in this case was the Kingston Rd route (today's 502 Downtowner).

In 1973, the Kingston Rd route was renamed to "Downtowner" (today's 502 Downtowner) with a route extension to Bathurst station that was revoked in 1984. Also in 1973, with the renaming of "Kingston Rd" to "Downtowner", the Kingston Rd Tripper became simply "Kingston Rd" and ultimately the 503 Kingston Rd.

Until December 29, 2015, the 503 Kingston Rd route operated with streetcars from Bingham Loop (Victoria Park and Kingston Road) to York Street (via King, Church and Wellington Streets), after which temporary replacement bus service served the route also from Bingham Loop to York Street. Starting June 19, 2017, streetcars resumed operating on the route but to Spadina Avenue (Charlotte Loop) instead of York Street as the western terminal.

From July 31, 2017, until February 16, 2018, buses replaced streetcars on the 503 Kingston Rd route due to a shortage of streetcars resulting from the late delivery of the new Bombardier Flexity Outlook streetcars. The buses operated from Bingham Loop to York Street.

On February 20, 2018, streetcars returned to route 503 Kingston Rd running from Bingham Loop to Spadina Avenue. However, the roles of routes 502 Downtowner and 503 Kingston Rd were reversed. Prior to that date, route 502 provided base workday service supplemented by route 503 in the rush hours. Since that date, route 503 provides base service while route 502 provides rush-hour-only service. These changes were to support the King Street Pilot Project which resulted in increased ridership along downtown King Street. However, effective September 2, 2018, these changes were reversed, but 503 Kingston Rd continued to operate with streetcar service west to Spadina Avenue.

On January 7, 2019, the 503 route returned to shuttle bus operation to accommodate construction along Wellington Street. Buses used York street as the western terminal. Effective September 3, 2019, the 502 Downtowner service was suspended and replaced with the 503 Kingston Rd service to accommodate some construction projects. Route 503 service was upgraded to operating weekdays excluding evenings instead of just during rush hours. The construction projects ended in November 2019; however, the consolidation of Kingston Road service into 503 Kingston Rd remained in effect.

In March 2020, the COVID-19 pandemic resulted in a loss of ridership on the TTC. As a result, on March 24 the TTC shortened the 503 Kingston Rd route to run only along Kingston Road between Bingham Loop and Woodbine Loop. Then, effective May 11, the 22A Coxwell bus replaced the remainder of the 503 route full-time

On June 22, 2020, streetcar service returned to the route, running from Bingham Loop to Spadina Avenue (Charlotte Loop). Service was provided by the low-floor, accessible Flexity Outlook streetcars. Starting September 4, 2022, 503 streetcars were diverted to Bathurst Street (Wolseley Loop). Effective November 21, 2022, the TTC scheduled buses to replace streetcars on the route to allow upgrades to the overhead wires for pantograph operation. Replacement buses operate from Bingham Loop to York Street.

Sites along the line
From east to west:

Upper Beaches
Leslieville
South Riverdale
George Brown College
Financial District

References

External links

TTC Official site
TTC route page for 503 Kingston Rd

Streetcar routes in Toronto
4 ft 10⅞ in gauge railways